USS Preble may refer to the following ships of the United States Navy:

 , was a sloop-of-war that fought at the Battle of Lake Champlain in the War of 1812
 , was a sloop that fought in the Mexican–American War and the American Civil War, and visited Japan. She was accidentally destroyed by fire in 1863
 , launched in 1901, was a  that served in World War I
 , launched in 1920, was a  that served in the Pacific campaign of World War II
 , launched in 1959; decommissioned 1991, was a  guided missile destroyer which saw action in the Vietnam War.
 , launched in 2001, is an  currently in commission

United States Navy ship names